Xinxian may refer to:

Xin County, county in Henan, China
Xinfu District, Xinzhou, formerly Xinxian or Xin County, Shanxi, China
Xinxian, Mengcun County, town in Hebei, China